Vania King and Michaëlla Krajicek were the defending champions; however, they were eliminated by Olga Govortsova and Alla Kudryavtseva in the semifinals.
Finally, Govortsova and Kudryavtseva defeated Andrea Hlaváčková and Lucie Hradecká in the final, 6–3, 4–6, [10–8].

Seeds

  Renata Voráčová /  Barbora Záhlavová-Strýcová (quarterfinals)
  Olga Govortsova /  Alla Kudryavtseva (champions)
  Vania King /  Michaëlla Krajicek (semifinals)
  Andrea Hlaváčková /  Lucie Hradecká (final)

Main draw

Draw

References
 Main Draw

Cellular South Cup
2011 Regions Morgan Keegan Championships and the Cellular South Cup